Matthew Stevens is a snooker player.

Matthew Stevens may also refer to:
Matthew Stevens (musician) (born 1982), Canadian jazz guitarist
Matt Stevens (rugby union) (born 1982), English rugby union player, who played at prop for Bath and England
Matt Stevens (quarterback) (born 1964), former NFL quarterback
Matt Stevens (safety) (born 1973), former NFL safety
Matty Stevens (born 1998), English football player

See also
Matthew Stephens (disambiguation)
Matthew Stevenson